Wells-Jankovic syndrome is a rare neurologic disorder characterized by spastic paraparesis presents in late childhood along with hearing loss.

In 1986 Wells and Jankovic reported the condition in 6 males. There have been no new cases in the literature since 1986.

References 

Diseases and disorders
Diseases named for discoverer